The 1906 Oklahoma A&M Aggies football team represented Oklahoma A&M College in the 1906 college football season. This was the sixth year of football at A&M and the first under Boyd Hill. The Aggies played their home games in Stillwater, Oklahoma Territory. They finished the season 1–4–2.

Schedule

References

Oklahoma AandM
Oklahoma State Cowboys football seasons
Oklahoma AandM Aggies football